The Indian Pharmacist Association (IPA) is the professional body for pharmacists of India. Members include hospital pharmacists, manufacturing pharmacists, teachers and clinical pharmacists. Founded in 2011, the association is a member of the Global Health Workforce Alliance (WHO). The IPA is emerging as one of the largest organizations of pharmacists in India. The main objective of IPA is proper placement of pharmacists to play a role in the health care sector in India.

Indian Pharmacist Association (IPA) recently organised a national conference on Indian pharmacists at Maulana Azad Institute of Dental Sciences in Delhi. The theme for the conference was ‘Challenges Today and Tomorrow.’ Different associations representing various states participated in the conference.

References

External links
 Official website
 Indian Pharmacist Association - Member of Global Health Workforce Alliance (WHO)

Pharmacy organisations in India